Jonathan Levit (born April 20, 1971) is an American magician, actor, television host and theatrical producer. He has appeared in quite a number of movies and television series, and was the host of VH1's reality series, Celebracadabra. Jonathan also performs frequently at the World Famous Magic Castle in Hollywood.

Biography

Early life 
At the age of 3, Levit experienced life as a world traveler, moving with his family to Iran for several years. During those years, he would take in the culture from all over Europe and the world.

At the age of 8, Levit was bitten by the performing bug, and his life was never same. While back in America, Levit happened upon some old magic tricks in the basement of his home, which belonged to his father. Jonathan first set foot on stage to perform his first magic act at the age of 12. That same year, Levit appeared on The Sally Jessy Raphael Show along with David Copperfield as a guest.

Levit continued his training as a magician, studying with some of the top minds in the art, honing his sleight of hand and performance skills, at the same time receiving numerous awards in close up, stage and street performing competitions.

Producing grabbed Levit's interest while in college at Syracuse University in New York. Levit would produce a variety of sold out shows on and off campus during his academic career, casting many performers that have gone on to become forces of their own in the entertainment fields.

Before leaving Syracuse, Levit was sent the inspiration he needed and would look back on to give him the push to pursue his true interest. Bob Costas wrote Levit a note telling him to "follow your dreams...you can't go wrong." He still holds that note from time to time as a reminder. This was the spark Levit needed, as he loaded up his car and set out for Hollywood.

Career 
Upon moving to Los Angeles, Levit immediately dove into training at various acting studios. It didn't take long for him to get into his groove once again. His first appearance on television came in the form of a starring role, opposite Ricky Jay, on The X-Files. This role would pave the way for an adventurous and successful life as an actor and television host. Appearing in starring roles in top-rated television shows and commercial films, Jonathan has enjoyed a constant journey forward. As a television host, Levit has been swept all over the world, exploring some of the most intriguing and exciting stories imaginable.

While at home in Los Angeles, Levit continues to work as an actor, television host and voiceover artist and is often a welcomed performer at the Magic Castle in Hollywood. Here, he has the opportunity to hone his other lifelong passion of performing magic. It's this balance of acting and magic that keeps Levit sharp - "both arts enhance each other."

Filmography

References

External links
Jonathan Levit's Official Website

1971 births
Living people
American magicians